Rubidium (37Rb) has 36 isotopes, with naturally occurring rubidium being composed of just two isotopes; 85Rb (72.2%) and the radioactive 87Rb (27.8%). Normal mixes of rubidium are radioactive enough to fog photographic film in approximately 30 to 60 days.

It readily substitutes for potassium in minerals, and is therefore fairly widespread. 87Rb has been used extensively in dating rocks; 87Rb decays to stable strontium-87 by emission of a beta particle (an electron ejected from the nucleus). During fractional crystallization, Sr tends to become concentrated in plagioclase, leaving Rb in the liquid phase. Hence, the Rb/Sr ratio in residual magma may increase over time, resulting in rocks with increasing Rb/Sr ratios with increasing differentiation. The highest ratios (10 or higher) occur in pegmatites. If the initial amount of Sr is known or can be extrapolated, the age can be determined by measurement of the Rb and Sr concentrations and the 87Sr/86Sr ratio. The dates indicate the true age of the minerals only if the rocks have not been subsequently altered. See rubidium–strontium dating for a more detailed discussion.

Other than 87Rb, the longest-lived radioisotopes are 83Rb with a half-life of 86.2 days, 84Rb with a half-life of 33.1 days, and 86Rb with a half-life of 18.642 days. All other radioisotopes have half-lives less than a day.

82Rb is used in some cardiac positron emission tomography scans to assess myocardial perfusion. It has a half-life of 1.273 minutes. It does not exist naturally, but can be made from the decay of 82Sr.

List of isotopes 

|-
| 71Rb
| style="text-align:right" | 37
| style="text-align:right" | 34
| 70.96532(54)#
|
| p
| 70Kr
| 5/2−#
|
|
|-
| 72Rb
| style="text-align:right" | 37
| style="text-align:right" | 35
| 71.95908(54)#
| <1.5 μs
| p
| 71Kr
| 3+#
|
|
|-
| style="text-indent:1em" | 72mRb
| colspan="3" style="text-indent:2em" | 100(100)# keV
| 1# μs
| p
| 71Kr
| 1−#
|
|
|-
| 73Rb
| style="text-align:right" | 37
| style="text-align:right" | 36
| 72.95056(16)#
| <30 ns
| p
| 72Kr
| 3/2−#
|
|
|-
| 74Rb
| style="text-align:right" | 37
| style="text-align:right" | 37
| 73.944265(4)
| 64.76(3) ms
| β+
| 74Kr
| (0+)
|
|
|-
| 75Rb
| style="text-align:right" | 37
| style="text-align:right" | 38
| 74.938570(8)
| 19.0(12) s
| β+
| 75Kr
| (3/2−)
|
|
|-
| rowspan=2|76Rb
| rowspan=2 style="text-align:right" | 37
| rowspan=2 style="text-align:right" | 39
| rowspan=2|75.9350722(20)
| rowspan=2|36.5(6) s
| β+
| 76Kr
| rowspan=2|1(−)
| rowspan=2|
| rowspan=2|
|-
| β+, α (3.8×10−7%)
| 72Se
|-
| style="text-indent:1em" | 76mRb
| colspan="3" style="text-indent:2em" | 316.93(8) keV
| 3.050(7) μs
|
|
| (4+)
|
|
|-
| 77Rb
| style="text-align:right" | 37
| style="text-align:right" | 40
| 76.930408(8)
| 3.77(4) min
| β+
| 77Kr
| 3/2−
|
|
|-
| 78Rb
| style="text-align:right" | 37
| style="text-align:right" | 41
| 77.928141(8)
| 17.66(8) min
| β+
| 78Kr
| 0(+)
|
|
|-
| rowspan=2 style="text-indent:1em" | 78mRb
| rowspan=2 colspan="3" style="text-indent:2em" | 111.20(10) keV
| rowspan=2|5.74(5) min
| β+ (90%)
| 78Kr
| rowspan=2|4(−)
| rowspan=2|
| rowspan=2|
|-
| IT (10%)
| 78Rb
|-
| 79Rb
| style="text-align:right" | 37
| style="text-align:right" | 42
| 78.923989(6)
| 22.9(5) min
| β+
| 79Kr
| 5/2+
|
|
|-
| 80Rb
| style="text-align:right" | 37
| style="text-align:right" | 43
| 79.922519(7)
| 33.4(7) s
| β+
| 80Kr
| 1+
|
|
|-
| style="text-indent:1em" | 80mRb
| colspan="3" style="text-indent:2em" | 494.4(5) keV
| 1.6(2) μs
|
|
| 6+
|
|
|-
| 81Rb
| style="text-align:right" | 37
| style="text-align:right" | 44
| 80.918996(6)
| 4.570(4) h
| β+
| 81Kr
| 3/2−
|
|
|-
| rowspan=2 style="text-indent:1em" | 81mRb
| rowspan=2 colspan="3" style="text-indent:2em" | 86.31(7) keV
| rowspan=2|30.5(3) min
| IT (97.6%)
| 81Rb
| rowspan=2|9/2+
| rowspan=2|
| rowspan=2|
|-
| β+ (2.4%)
| 81Kr
|-
| 82Rb
| style="text-align:right" | 37
| style="text-align:right" | 45
| 81.9182086(30)
| 1.273(2) min
| β+
| 82Kr
| 1+
|
|
|-
| rowspan=2 style="text-indent:1em" | 82mRb
| rowspan=2 colspan="3" style="text-indent:2em" | 69.0(15) keV
| rowspan=2|6.472(5) h
| β+ (99.67%)
| 82Kr
| rowspan=2|5−
| rowspan=2|
| rowspan=2|
|-
| IT (.33%)
| 82Rb
|-
| 83Rb
| style="text-align:right" | 37
| style="text-align:right" | 46
| 82.915110(6)
| 86.2(1) d
| EC
| 83Kr
| 5/2−
|
|
|-
| style="text-indent:1em" | 83mRb
| colspan="3" style="text-indent:2em" | 42.11(4) keV
| 7.8(7) ms
| IT
| 83Rb
| 9/2+
|
|
|-
| rowspan=2|84Rb
| rowspan=2 style="text-align:right" | 37
| rowspan=2 style="text-align:right" | 47
| rowspan=2|83.914385(3)
| rowspan=2|33.1(1) d
| β+ (96.2%)
| 84Kr
| rowspan=2|2−
| rowspan=2|
| rowspan=2|
|-
| β− (3.8%)
| 84Sr
|-
| rowspan=2 style="text-indent:1em" | 84mRb
| rowspan=2 colspan="3" style="text-indent:2em" | 463.62(9) keV
| rowspan=2|20.26(4) min
| IT (>99.9%)
| 84Rb
| rowspan=2|6−
| rowspan=2|
| rowspan=2|
|-
| β+ (<.1%)
| 84Kr
|-
| 85Rb
| style="text-align:right" | 37
| style="text-align:right" | 48
| 84.911789738(12)
| colspan=3 align=center|Stable
| 5/2−
| 0.7217(2)
|
|-
| rowspan=2|86Rb
| rowspan=2 style="text-align:right" | 37
| rowspan=2 style="text-align:right" | 49
| rowspan=2|85.91116742(21)
| rowspan=2|18.642(18) d
| β− (99.9948%)
| 86Sr
| rowspan=2|2−
| rowspan=2|
| rowspan=2|
|-
| EC (.0052%)
| 86Kr
|-
| style="text-indent:1em" | 86mRb
| colspan="3" style="text-indent:2em" | 556.05(18) keV
| 1.017(3) min
| IT
| 86Rb
| 6−
|
|
|-
| 87Rb
| style="text-align:right" | 37
| style="text-align:right" | 50
| 86.909180527(13)
| 4.923(22)×1010 y
| β−
| 87Sr
| 3/2−
| 0.2783(2)
|
|-
| 88Rb
| style="text-align:right" | 37
| style="text-align:right" | 51
| 87.91131559(17)
| 17.773(11) min
| β−
| 88Sr
| 2−
|
|
|-
| 89Rb
| style="text-align:right" | 37
| style="text-align:right" | 52
| 88.912278(6)
| 15.15(12) min
| β−
| 89Sr
| 3/2−
|
|
|-
| 90Rb
| style="text-align:right" | 37
| style="text-align:right" | 53
| 89.914802(7)
| 158(5) s
| β−
| 90Sr
| 0−
|
|
|-
| rowspan=2 style="text-indent:1em" | 90mRb
| rowspan=2 colspan="3" style="text-indent:2em" | 106.90(3) keV
| rowspan=2|258(4) s
| β− (97.4%)
| 90Sr
| rowspan=2|3−
| rowspan=2|
| rowspan=2|
|-
| IT (2.6%)
| 90 Rb
|-
| 91Rb
| style="text-align:right" | 37
| style="text-align:right" | 54
| 90.916537(9)
| 58.4(4) s
| β−
| 91Sr
| 3/2(−)
|
|
|-
| rowspan=2|92Rb
| rowspan=2 style="text-align:right" | 37
| rowspan=2 style="text-align:right" | 55
| rowspan=2|91.919729(7)
| rowspan=2|4.492(20) s
| β− (99.98%)
| 92Sr
| rowspan=2|0−
| rowspan=2|
| rowspan=2|
|-
| β−, n (.0107%)
| 91Sr
|-
| rowspan=2|93Rb
| rowspan=2 style="text-align:right" | 37
| rowspan=2 style="text-align:right" | 56
| rowspan=2|92.922042(8)
| rowspan=2|5.84(2) s
| β− (98.65%)
| 93Sr
| rowspan=2|5/2−
| rowspan=2|
| rowspan=2|
|-
| β−, n (1.35%)
| 92Sr
|-
| style="text-indent:1em" | 93mRb
| colspan="3" style="text-indent:2em" | 253.38(3) keV
| 57(15) μs
|
|
| (3/2−,5/2−)
|
|
|-
| rowspan=2|94Rb
| rowspan=2 style="text-align:right" | 37
| rowspan=2 style="text-align:right" | 57
| rowspan=2|93.926405(9)
| rowspan=2|2.702(5) s
| β− (89.99%)
| 94Sr
| rowspan=2|3(−)
| rowspan=2|
| rowspan=2|
|-
| β−, n (10.01%)
| 93Sr
|-
| rowspan=2|95Rb
| rowspan=2 style="text-align:right" | 37
| rowspan=2 style="text-align:right" | 58
| rowspan=2|94.929303(23)
| rowspan=2|377.5(8) ms
| β− (91.27%)
| 95Sr
| rowspan=2|5/2−
| rowspan=2|
| rowspan=2|
|-
| β−, n (8.73%)
| 94Sr
|-
| rowspan=2|96Rb
| rowspan=2 style="text-align:right" | 37
| rowspan=2 style="text-align:right" | 59
| rowspan=2|95.93427(3)
| rowspan=2|202.8(33) ms
| β− (86.6%)
| 96Sr
| rowspan=2|2+
| rowspan=2|
| rowspan=2|
|-
| β−, n (13.4%)
| 95Sr
|-
| rowspan=3 style="text-indent:1em" | 96mRb
| rowspan=3 colspan="3" style="text-indent:2em" | 0(200)# keV
| rowspan=3|200# ms [>1 ms]
| β−
| 96Sr
| rowspan=3|1(−#)
| rowspan=3|
| rowspan=3|
|-
| IT
| 96Rb
|-
| β−, n
| 95Sr
|-
| rowspan=2|97Rb
| rowspan=2 style="text-align:right" | 37
| rowspan=2 style="text-align:right" | 60
| rowspan=2|96.93735(3)
| rowspan=2|169.9(7) ms
| β− (74.3%)
| 97Sr
| rowspan=2|3/2+
| rowspan=2|
| rowspan=2|
|-
| β−, n (25.7%)
| 96Sr
|-
| rowspan=3|98Rb
| rowspan=3 style="text-align:right" | 37
| rowspan=3 style="text-align:right" | 61
| rowspan=3|97.94179(5)
| rowspan=3|114(5) ms
| β−(86.14%)
| 98Sr
| rowspan=3|(0,1)(−#)
| rowspan=3|
| rowspan=3|
|-
| β−, n (13.8%)
| 97Sr
|-
| β−, 2n (.051%)
| 96Sr
|-
| style="text-indent:1em" | 98mRb
| colspan="3" style="text-indent:2em" | 290(130) keV
| 96(3) ms
| β−
| 97Sr
| (3,4)(+#)
|
|
|-
| rowspan=2|99Rb
| rowspan=2 style="text-align:right" | 37
| rowspan=2 style="text-align:right" | 62
| rowspan=2|98.94538(13)
| rowspan=2|50.3(7) ms
| β− (84.1%)
| 99Sr
| rowspan=2|(5/2+)
| rowspan=2|
| rowspan=2|
|-
| β−, n (15.9%)
| 98Sr
|-
| rowspan=3|100Rb
| rowspan=3 style="text-align:right" | 37
| rowspan=3 style="text-align:right" | 63
| rowspan=3|99.94987(32)#
| rowspan=3|51(8) ms
| β− (94.25%)
| 100Sr
| rowspan=3|(3+)
| rowspan=3|
| rowspan=3|
|-
| β−, n (5.6%)
| 99Sr
|-
| β−, 2n (.15%)
| 98Sr
|-
| rowspan=2|101Rb
| rowspan=2 style="text-align:right" | 37
| rowspan=2 style="text-align:right" | 64
| rowspan=2|100.95320(18)
| rowspan=2|32(5) ms
| β− (69%)
| 101Sr
| rowspan=2|(3/2+)#
| rowspan=2|
| rowspan=2|
|-
| β−, n (31%)
| 100Sr
|-
| rowspan=2|102Rb
| rowspan=2 style="text-align:right" | 37
| rowspan=2 style="text-align:right" | 65
| rowspan=2|101.95887(54)#
| rowspan=2|37(5) ms
| β− (82%)
| 102Sr
| rowspan=2|
| rowspan=2|
| rowspan=2|
|-
| β−, n (18%)
| 101Sr
|-
| 103Rb
| style="text-align:right" | 37
| style="text-align:right" | 66
| 
| 26 ms
| β−
| 103Sr
| 
|
|
|-
| 104Rb
| style="text-align:right" | 37
| style="text-align:right" | 67
| 
| 35# ms (>550 ns)
| β−?
| 104Sr
| 
|
|
|-
| 105Rb
| style="text-align:right" | 37
| style="text-align:right" | 68
| 
| 
| 
| 
| 
|
|
|-
| 106Rb
| style="text-align:right" | 37
| style="text-align:right" | 69
| 
| 
| 
| 
| 
|
|

Rubidium-87

Rubidium-87 is an isotope of rubidium. Rubidium-87 was the first and the most popular atom for making Bose–Einstein condensates in dilute atomic gases. Even though rubidium-85 is more abundant, rubidium-87 has a positive scattering length, which means it is mutually repulsive, at low temperatures. This prevents a collapse of all but the smallest condensates. It is also easy to evaporatively cool, with a consistent strong mutual scattering. There is also a strong supply of cheap uncoated diode lasers typically used in CD writers, which can operate at the correct wavelength.

Rubidium-87 has an atomic mass of 86.9091835 u, and a binding energy of 757,853 keV.

References 

 Isotope masses from:

 Isotopic compositions and standard atomic masses from:

 Half-life, spin, and isomer data selected from the following sources.

 
Rubidium
Rubidium